"A Praise Chorus" is a song by American rock band Jimmy Eat World. It was released in 2002 as the fourth single released from the band's fourth album Bleed American, which was later retitled Jimmy Eat World.

Songs "praised" by this song
After the second stanza, references to seven songs become the "praise chorus" of the title. The first line is sung continuously in the background before the other six are sung over it.

Tommy James and the Shondells – "Crimson and Clover" – "Crimson and clover, over and over", sung continuously in the background.
Madness – "Our House" – "Our house in the middle of the street."
The Promise Ring – "Why Did Ever We Meet" – "Why did we ever meet?"
Bad Company – "Rock 'n' Roll Fantasy" – "[Started] my rock 'n' roll fantasy."
They Might Be Giants – "Don't Let's Start" – "Don't, don't, don't let's start." 
The Promise Ring – "All of My Everythings" – "Why did we ever part?"
Mötley Crüe – "Kickstart My Heart" – "Kickstart my rock 'n roll heart."

Following the recording of the song's demo (which contains none of these songs, but rather a repetition of "Fast action/Come on, come on, come on/Fast action/So what'cha here for"), the band felt that it needed some additional work in the chorus section. They sent the recording to The Promise Ring's Davey von Bohlen, a friend of the band, and asked him to "Sing [us] something that [we] know". During live performances, Tom Linton sings the repeated "Crimson and Clover" line, while Jim Adkins sings the lyrics from the other six songs.

Track listing
The Middle/A Praise Chorus AUS Tour EP
"The Middle"
"A Praise Chorus"
"Bleed American" (live from the 9:30 Club, Washington DC 6/4/02)
"Firestarter" (non-album) (The Prodigy cover)
"The Middle" (acoustic)

Promotional compact disc
"A Praise Chorus"
"Authority Song" (demo version)

Charts

References

Jimmy Eat World songs
2001 singles
2001 songs
Songs written by Tommy James
DreamWorks Records singles